Arthur de Cardonnel FitzUryan Rice, 6th Baron Dynevor (24 January 1836 – 8 June 1911), was a British peer.

Life 
He was the son of Francis William Rice, 5th Baron Dynevor, and Harriett Ives Barker. His elder sister, Ellen Joyce, was a pioneer of women's emigration.

On 17 October 1855 Rice matriculated at Christ Church, Oxford. He gained a B.A. degree in 1855 and was awarded an M.A. degree in 1865.

Rice married Selina Lascelles, the daughter of Hon. Arthur Lascelles, the fifth son of Henry Lascelles, 2nd Earl of Harewood. The child of the couple was Walter FitzUryan Rice, born 17 August 1873.  Walter later reverted to the Welsh form of his name "Rhys".

He became a member of Carmarthenshire County Council at the inaugural elections in 1889, representing Llandybie.

The 6th Baron Dynevor died on 8 June 1911 aged 75 at Dynevor Castle.

References

1836 births
1911 deaths
 06
Dynevor, Arthur Rice, 6th Baron
Arthur
Members of Carmarthenshire County Council